Biosphere reserves in Guatemala include:

 Maya in El Petén
 Tikal in El Petén
 Montañas Mayas Chiquibul in El Petén
 Trifinio in Chiquimula
 Sierra de las Minas in Alta Verapaz, Baja Verapaz. El Progreso, Zacapa, Izabal
 Visis Cabá in El Quiché

See also
 List of national parks of Guatemala

References

 
Nature conservation in Guatemala
Guatemala geography-related lists